Bayard Taylor Horton (1895–1980) was an American physician.

1895 births
1980 deaths
20th-century American physicians